Down the Streets of My Old Neighborhood is an album by fiddle and mandolin player Peter Ostroushko, released in 1986. It is out of print, yet remains highly sought after amongst his fans, and is to this day his most celebrated release.

Track listing 
All songs by Peter Ostroushko unless otherwise noted.
"Sluz Blues"
"Back Home in N.E. Minneapolis"
"Red Dancing Shoes"
"B-O-R-S-C-H-T"
"Rose of Old Red Wing"
"Oh, Glory"
"Corny Dog Ramble"
"Down the Streets of My Old Neighborhood"
"Hey Good Looking"
"Ukrainian Medley: In the Meadow Is A Well / Suffering"
"The Too-Tight Polka"

Personnel
Peter Ostroushko – mandolin, fiddle, guitar, vocals

References

1986 albums
Peter Ostroushko albums
Rounder Records albums